A list of plants native to the mountain ranges of Romania.

Many Romanian mountain ranges, mountains, and peaks are part of the Southern Carpathians System, and the Carpathian montane forests ecoregion.

List of flowering plants of the Romanian mountain ranges

 Aconitum anthora
 Androsace lactea
 Androsace villosa
 Alyssum repens
 Artemisia baumgarteni
 Anthemis carpatica
 Armeria alpina
 Aster alpinus
 Biscutella laevigata
 Bruckenthalia spiculifolia (syn. Erica spiculifolia)
 Centaurea pinnatifida
 Campanula napuligera
 Campanula alpina
 Campanula cochleariifolia
 Cerastium arvense
 Cerastium lanatum
 Cortusa matthioli
 Carlina acaulis
 Calamintha baumgarteni
 Dianthus spiculifolius
 Dianthus callizonus
 Dianthus gelidus
 Dianthus nardiformis
 Dianthus tenuifolius
 Doronicum carpaticum
 Draba compacta
 Dryas octopetala
 Erigeron nanus
 Eritrichium nanum
 Gentiana kochiana
 Geum reptans
 Gentiana bulgarica
 Gentiana lutea
 Gentiana orbicularis
 Gentiana frigida
 Gypsophila petraea
 Geum montanum
 Gentiana nivalis
 Hedysarum obscurum
 Helianthemum tomentosum
 Hesperis alpina
 Hieradum aurantiacum
 Hieracium oillosum 
 Hypochaeris uniflora
 Knautia longijolia
 Leontopodium alpinum
 Leontodon pseudotaraxaci
 Libanotis humilis
 Linaria alpina
 Linum extraaxillare
 Lloydia serotina
 Minuaftia recurva
 Minuartia sedoides
 Nigritella rubra
 Onobrychis transsilvanica
 Oxytropis campestris
 Oxytrnpis sericea
 Papaver pyrenaicum
 Pedicularis verticillata
 Pleurogyne carinthiaca
 Potentilla iernata
 Rhododendron kotschyi
 Scorzonera rosea
 Senecio capitatus
 Senecio carpaticus
 Saxifraga aiatratum
 Silene acaulis
 Saxifraga aizoides
 Saxifraga demissa
 Saxifraga opposiiifolia
 Saxifraga moschata
 Saxifraga luteouiridis
 Trollius europaeus
 Viola alpina
 Viola biflora

See also

References
 Al. Beldie, C. Pridvornic - Flori din munții noștri, Ed. Științifică, București, 1959
 Flora mică ilustrată a României, Editura agrosilvică, 1966
 Sârbu Anca, Biologie vegetală. Note de curs, Editura Universității din București, 1999.
 Lucia Popovici, Constanța Moruzi, Ion Toma - Atlas botanic, Editura didactică și pedagogică, București, 1985
 Milea Preda, Dicționar dendrofloricol, Editura Științifică și Enciclopedică, București, 1989
 Ion I. Băra, Petre Gh. Tarhon, Florin Floria - Plantele - izvor de sănătate, Chișinău, «Știința», 1993

.
Plants
Romania
.Plants
Southern Carpathians
Flora of the Carpathians